Djamel Benchadli (born 31 January 1963) is an Algerian football manager.

References

1963 births
Living people
Algerian football managers
ES Mostaganem managers
USM Bel Abbès managers
ASM Oran managers
MC Oran managers
USM Blida managers
WA Tlemcen managers
Algerian Ligue Professionnelle 1 managers
21st-century Algerian people